The Little Red School House and Elisabeth Irwin High School, also referred to as LREI, is a school in Manhattan, New York City. It was founded by Elisabeth Irwin in 1921 as the Little Red School House and is one of the city's first progressive schools. Created as a joint public-private educational experiment, the school tested principles of progressive education that had been advocated since the turn of the 20th century by John Dewey. The founders postulated that the lessons of progressive education could be applied successfully in the crowded, ethnically diverse public schools of the nation's largest city.

History
The school was founded in 1921 as a joint private-public educational experiment by reformer Elisabeth Irwin, and was well known as a testing ground for new concepts in education.

In 1932, after the onset of the Great Depression caused the Public Education Association to withdraw the funding that had allowed the school to exist within the New York City public school system, William O'Shea, the superintendent of schools – who had previously tried to close down the program because of its progressive ideas – announced that the school would be eliminated because of a budgetary crisis.  Parents raised sufficient funds to pay for salaries, but O'Shea refused to accept the money, and the school was forced to turn to private funding.  It moved to a building on Bleecker Street provided at no cost by the First Presbyterian Church and began a new life as an independent school.

The Little Red School House consists of a lower school, a middle school, and a high school. In the 1940s the Little Red School House's high-school students decided they wanted their school to be named after its founder, Elisabeth Irwin, making the full title of the institution The Little Red School House and Elisabeth Irwin High School.

Buildings
The Little Red School House and Elisabeth Irwin High School occupy two separate buildings, with a third space housing athletic facilities.

The middle-and-lower-school building is located at 272 Avenue of the Americas (Sixth Avenue) at Bleecker Street, while Elisabeth Irwin High School is at 40 Charlton Street between Sixth Avenue and Varick Street. In June 2008, LREI announced the acquisition of additional space with the purchase of 42 Charlton Street, directly next door. The new townhouse was to be renovated and connected to the existing building.  A separate building, the Thompson Street Gym, houses facilities for physical education and athletics. In November 2018, the school announced that it had purchased 15 Van Dam Street, directly behind the Charlton Street campus. The building contains the Soho Playhouse, and formerly housed the Huron Club, a social club frequented by members of the Democratic Party.

College placement
In 2017, graduates attended New York University, Boston University, California Institute of the Arts, Duke University, Princeton University, and many more. In 2015, graduates from Elisabeth Irwin High School attended Bennington College, Bard College, Skidmore College, Ithaca College, Northwestern University, Pitzer College, Sarah Lawrence College the University of Delaware and Vassar College, along with 38 other colleges and universities. In 2013, graduates attended Bard College, Kenyon College, Bennington College, Brown University, Cornell University, Sarah Lawrence College and the University of Colorado at Boulder, along with 22 other institutions, and in 2012, Bennington College, Hampshire College, Kenyon College, Skidmore College, and Wesleyan University, as well as 28 other schools.

Extracurricular activities

Sports
LREI's sports teams include soccer (boys, girls and MS co-ed), volleyball (HS girls, MS co-ed), cross-country track (co-ed), basketball (Varsity, boys and girls and JV boys), spring track (co-ed), tennis (co-ed), softball (girls), baseball (boys), golf (co-ed), swimming (co-ed). The school and team colors are red and white.

Directors and leaders

Directors
 Elisabeth Irwin (1921–1942) 
 Randolph B. Smith (1943–1966)
 F. Coit Johnson II (1966-1975)
 Andrew McLaren (1988–2004)
 Philip Kassen (2004–present)

Current staff
Director: Philip Kassen
 Director of Learning & Innovation: Mark Silberberg
High School Principal: Allison Isabell and Margaret Paul
Middle School Principal: Ana Fox Chaney
Lower School Principal: Faith Hunter

Notable alumni

Elliott Abrams, diplomat, lawyer, political scientist
Peter Berg, actor, film director, producer, writer
Kathy Boudin, radical, public health expert
Emory Cohen, actor
Angela Davis, political activist
Dominic DiGesu, musician
Robert De Niro, actor
Eric R. Dinallo, Superintendent of Insurance, New York State
Eric Eisner, lawyer and philanthropist, former president of The Geffen Company
Gus Green, musician
Nicolas "Nico" Heller, documentary film director, social media personality
Foster Hudson, musician
Elle King, singer
Peter Knobler, author
Michael and Robert Meeropol, sons of Ethel and Julius Rosenberg
Victor Navasky, professor, Columbia School of Journalism; editor, publisher emeritus, The Nation
Zac Posen, fashion designer
Ronald Radosh
Doug Rauch, musician
Harris Rosen, philanthropist and entrepreneur, president and chief operating officer, Rosen Hotels & Resorts
Toshi Seeger, filmmaker and environmental activist
Dan Shor, actor
Mary Travers, singer, member of folk group Peter, Paul and Mary
Benjamin Drake Wright, psychometrician
Edward Irving Wortis, author
Daniel Menaker, editor and father of Chapo Trap House host, Will Menaker

Affiliations
The Little Red School House's companion school from 1944 to 1971 was the Downtown Community School (DCS) on the Lower East Side, whose alumni include the writers Peter Manso, Ann Lauterbach, Peter Knobler and Richard Kostelanetz. Its director from 1951 to 1970 was educator and folklorist Norman Studer.

Affiliated organizations
National Association of Independent Schools
New York State Association of Independent Schools
New York Interschool

See also
The New York Foundation
Education in New York City
Elisabeth Irwin

References

External links

Official website
New York State Association of Independent Schools

Educational institutions established in 1921
Private K-12 schools in Manhattan
1921 establishments in New York City